The Middle is an American sitcom created by DeAnn Heline and Eileen Heisler for the ABC network. The Middle stars Patricia Heaton and Neil Flynn as Frankie and Mike Heck, a used-car saleswoman and the manager of a small mining firm respectively, who struggle to raise their children in the fictional middle-class town of Orson, Indiana. Their three children include the athletic but underachieving, slow-witted Axl (Charlie McDermott), cluelessly unpopular daughter Sue (Eden Sher), and frustrated, odd child-genius Brick (Atticus Shaffer). The Hecks find themselves embroiled in somewhat unusual events as they attempt to navigate their day-to-day lives. The series was met with a positive reception from television critics when it premiered on September 30, 2009, with a score of 70 on the aggregated reviews website Metacritic. On March 3, 2016, ABC renewed the series for an eighth season. On January 25, 2017, ABC renewed the series for a ninth season, later announced to be the show's last.

Series overview

Episodes

Season 1 (2009–10)

Season 2 (2010–11)

Season 3 (2011–12)

Season 4 (2012–13)

Season 5 (2013–14)

Season 6 (2014–15)

Season 7 (2015–16)

Season 8 (2016–17)

Season 9 (2017–18)

Ratings

Notes

References

External links 

http://www.tv.com/shows/the-middle/episodes/

Lists of American sitcom episodes
Episodes